was a Japanese judoka.

He was born in Fukuoka Prefecture. He entered the Japan Highway Public Corporation after graduating from Fukuoka University, and won the Men's -95 kg category silver medal at the Asian Championships in 1995.

He became famous when he defeated Fedor Emelianenko at the Russian judo championships held in 1998.

November 8, 2006, He died due to Myocardial infarction.

References

Japanese male judoka
1974 births
2006 deaths
Sportspeople from Fukuoka Prefecture
Universiade medalists in judo
Universiade bronze medalists for Japan
Medalists at the 1995 Summer Universiade
20th-century Japanese people
21st-century Japanese people